Val-Morin is a municipality in the Laurentides region of Quebec, Canada, part of the Les Laurentides Regional County Municipality.

Geography
Its territory includes numerous lakes such as La Salle, Lavallée, Bélair in the east, and Beauvais, Normand, and Valiquette in the west.

History
The geographic area now called Val-Morin was likely inhabited by First Nations people either Montagnais-Naskapi, Algonkin or Cree prior to European settlement.

In 1852, the Morin Township was formed. Morin was among the first residents and helped many settlers to settle here. In 1887, the Val-Morin Post Office opened, and in 1922, the Municipality of Val-Morin was established.

Originally farmers, residents of Val-Morin have turned to the development of Alpine ski resorts and outdoor activities in recent times.

Demographics

Population trend:
 Population in 2021: 3123 (2016 to 2021 population change: 8.8%)
 Population in 2016: 2870 
 Population in 2011: 2772
 Population in 2006: 2756
 Population in 2001: 2216
 Population in 1996: 2043
 Population in 1991: 1366

Private dwellings occupied by usual residents: 1487 (total dwellings: 2077)

Mother tongue:
 English as first language: 6.5%
 French as first language: 91.1%
 English and French as first language: 0.4%
 Other as first language: 2.0%

Economy
Val-Morin benefits from its close proximity to Montreal and the much traveled Highway 15. The "Le Petit Train du Nord" bike path and cross country ski trail and linear park cuts through Val-Morin bringing many cyclists and cross-country skiers through its territory. The Parc Dufresne regional park also attracts many hikers and cross-country skiers.

Education

Sainte Agathe Academy (of the Sir Wilfrid Laurier School Board) in Sainte-Agathe-des-Monts serves English-speaking students in this community for both elementary and secondary levels.

References

External links

Incorporated places in Laurentides
Municipalities in Quebec